St. Francis Xavier Roman Catholic Parish Complex is a historic former Roman Catholic church complex located in Buffalo in Erie County, New York.

Description
The St. Francis Xavier complex consists of a Lombard-Romanesque Revival basilica style church (1911–1913), a Queen Anne style rectory (1895), and a school completed over three phases in 1895, 1906, and 1956. The church measures  and is two and one-half stories high with a low-pitched red clay tile roof. A large rose window is centered on the front façade above a triple arched entry.

After the Diocese of Buffalo announced in 2007 that the parish would close, the Buffalo Religious Arts Center, a museum that collects religious artifacts from closed churches in Buffalo, bought the property and continues to occupy it.

It was listed on the National Register of Historic Places in 2009.

Ignatius Forness and John Hanbach were two of the founders of St. Francis Xavier Church on East Street in Buffalo, and when the church had its 50th jubilee (note ca 1990), Igantius Forness and one other man were guests of honor as the only surviving founders.

Gallery

References

Roman Catholic churches in New York (state)
Churches on the National Register of Historic Places in New York (state)
Queen Anne architecture in New York (state)
Redundant churches
Romanesque Revival church buildings in New York (state)
Roman Catholic churches in Buffalo, New York
National Register of Historic Places in Buffalo, New York